The Curry Coastal Pilot is a weekly newspaper published in Brookings, Oregon, United States, since 1946. It is published on Fridays by Country Media, Inc. and has a circulation of 5,223.

References

External links
 Curry Coastal Pilot (official website)
 Chronicling America Library of Congress entry

1946 establishments in Oregon
Brookings, Oregon
Curry County, Oregon
Newspapers published in Oregon
Oregon Newspaper Publishers Association
Newspapers established in 1946